Menegazzia nothofagi is a species of lichen from New Zealand and Australia. It was originally named as a species of Parmelia by Austrian botanist Alexander Zahlbruckner in 1940.

See also
List of Menegazzia species

References

aucklandica
Lichen species
Lichens described in 1983
Lichens of Australia
Lichens of New Zealand
Taxa named by Alexander Zahlbruckner